Statius Gellius (fl. 305 BC) was a Samnite general who fought against the Romans,  in the Second Samnite War. He was defeated and taken prisoner in 305 BC, at the Battle of Bovianum.

See also
 Gellia gens
 Gellius Egnatius
 Aulus Gellius

References

4th-century BC people
Generals
Samnite people
Statius
Prisoners of war